Ljubinić is a village located in the municipality of Obrenovac, Belgrade, Serbia. As of 2011 census, it has a population of 774 inhabitants.

References

Populated places in Serbia